The 2011 season was Pakhtakors 20th season  in the top Uzbek League in Uzbekistan. Pakhtakor competed in Uzbek League, Uzbek Cup and AFC Champions League tournaments.

Club

Current technical staff

After draw result in Bukhara, Ravshan Khaydarov resigned his position as coach. Murod Ismailov is appointed as new head coach of Pakhtakor.

Players

Squad

Youth squad
Youth team of Pakhtakor plays in Uzbek Youth League

Transfers

Winter 2010-11

In:

Out:
 Four player left the club

Summer 2011

In:

 (on loan)

Out:

Pre-season matches

Competitions
Pakhtakor competed in all major competitions: Uzbek League, the Uzbek Cup and the AFC Champions League.

Uzbek League

League table

Matches
Kickoff times are in Uzbekistan Time (UZT) – UTC+5.

Uzbek Cup

Matches
Kickoff times are in Uzbekistan Time (UZT) – UTC+5.

AFC Champions League

Group stage

Matches

Squad statistics

Appearances and goals

Player statistics are only for Uzbek League matches Competitive matches only, includes appearances as substitute.

Top Scorers

All

Note:goals scored in all competitions. 

Uzbek League

Uzbek Cup

AFC Champions League

References

External links
 F.C. Pakhtakor official website
 Championat.uz 

Pak
Pakhtakor Tashkent FK seasons